Gelmin Javier Rivas Boada (born 23 March 1989) is a Venezuelan footballer who currently plays as a striker for Al-Khaldiya SC.

Club career 
Rivas joined MLS side, D.C. United on 31 August 2020. On 6 September 2020, Rivas made his debut in a 0–0 draw against New York City FC. He scored his first goal for United on 24 October 2020, in a 2–1 win over Atlanta United.  He was released by D.C. United on November 30, 2020.

International career
Rivas made his senior international debut for the Venezuela national team on 29 May 2010 against Canada (1–1), after he came on as a substitute for Miku in the 90th minute of that game.

Statistics

Honours
Anzoátegui
 Copa de Venezuela: 2012

Tachira
 Venezuelan Primera División: 2014–15

Al Hilal
 Saudi Professional League: 2017–18
 Saudi Super Cup: 2018

References

External links
 

1989 births
Living people
People from Cumaná
Venezuelan footballers
Venezuela international footballers
Association football forwards
2015 Copa América players
Deportivo Anzoátegui players
Deportivo Táchira F.C. players
Ittihad FC players
Sharjah FC players
Al Hilal SFC players
Al-Rayyan SC players
Boston River players
MKE Ankaragücü footballers
D.C. United players
Al-Shorta SC players
Águilas Doradas Rionegro players
Saudi Professional League players
UAE Pro League players
Qatar Stars League players
Venezuelan Primera División players
Uruguayan Primera División players
Süper Lig players
Venezuelan expatriate footballers
Expatriate footballers in Saudi Arabia
Expatriate footballers in the United Arab Emirates
Expatriate footballers in Qatar
Expatriate footballers in Turkey
Expatriate soccer players in the United States
Expatriate footballers in Uruguay
Venezuelan expatriate sportspeople in Saudi Arabia
Venezuelan expatriate sportspeople in the United Arab Emirates
Venezuelan expatriate sportspeople in Qatar
Venezuelan expatriate sportspeople in Turkey
Venezuelan expatriate sportspeople in the United States
Venezuelan expatriate sportspeople in Uruguay
Major League Soccer players